The House at 54 E. 53rd Terrace is a historic home located at Kansas City, Missouri. It was designed by architect Mary Rockwell Hook and built in 1908. It is a two-story, compact, rectangular frame dwelling with an asymmetrical roof. The front facade features a narrow balcony. The house includes an interior mural by her sister Bertha.

It was listed on the National Register of Historic Places in 1983.

References

Houses on the National Register of Historic Places in Missouri
Houses completed in 1908
Houses in Kansas City, Missouri
National Register of Historic Places in Kansas City, Missouri